Wim Omloop (born 5 October 1971) is a Belgian former cyclist. He competed in the individual road race at the 1992 Summer Olympics.

References

External links
 

1971 births
Living people
Belgian male cyclists
Olympic cyclists of Belgium
Cyclists at the 1992 Summer Olympics
People from Herentals
Cyclists from Antwerp Province